China National Highway 111 runs from Beijing to Mohe of Heilongjiang province.

It leaves Beijing heading north-east. In November 2019, an expansion to the northernmost town in China, Mohe (Walagan), was completed.

Route and distance

See also
 China National Highways

References

Notes

111
Road transport in Beijing
Transport in Hebei
Transport in Inner Mongolia
Transport in Heilongjiang